Limerick is a small township in Hastings County, Ontario, Canada, near Limerick Lake. The Township is bordered by the Town of Bancroft, Township of Wollaston and the joined Townships of Tudor and Cashel. The township is heavily forested, as is the shoreline of the Limerick Lake, the main industry in the township being forestry and logging. The population of Limerick Township is approx. 300 full-year residents, and another 1000 seasonal residents.

It was named in 1887 after the city of Limerick in Ireland.

Communities
The township of Limerick comprises a number of villages and hamlets, including the following communities:
Brinklow, Martins Landing, Ormsby, Ormsby Junction, St. Ola, Steenburg Lake.

Mining 

Pancontinental Resources Corporation's (Pancon) plans to build a nickel, copper, and cobalt mine in Limerick was met with resistance from the local community in 2018. 5.1 million tons of nickel, cobalt, and copper exist near the surface of a 880 hectare area known as the McBride Project, located near Canadian National Railway, mining rights to the area are owned by Derek McBride's private company Hastings Highlands Resources Limited, which had an option agreement with Pancon. Pancon ceased collaborating on the project on March 2019, while McBridge spoke on Moose FM about his aspirations to find a new business partner.

Demographics 

First official language spoken:
 English as first language: 100%
 French as first language: 0%
 English and French as first language: 0%
 Other as first language: 0%

See also
List of communities in Ontario
List of townships in Ontario

References

External links

Township municipalities in Ontario
Lower-tier municipalities in Ontario
Municipalities in Hastings County